Shalimar Garden is a residential-cum-commercial locality in the North Western part of the city of Ghaziabad, Uttar Pradesh. It comprises three wards of the Ghaziabad Municipal Corporation and accordingly has three major divisions, viz. Shalimar Garden (Main), Shalimar Garden Extension-I and Shalimar Garden Extension-II. Almost all the construction in the area is that of Low Rise builder apartments, with shops on the lower floors and apartments on the higher floors.

Location 
It lies on the north of G.T. Road, and is bound by Dilshad Garden (Delhi) on the west and Rajendra Nagar, Sahibabad on the east. The Loni Road forms its northern boundary. The nearest metro station of the Delhi Metro network is Raj Bagh which is at a distance of 1.5 km. The nearest Bus depot is Seemapuri Depot, which is at a distance of around 2 km. The nearest railway station is Sahibabad, which is around 4 km. The nearest airport is the Indira Gandhi International, which is 30 km. app from here. The Ghaziabad, Anand Vihar, New Delhi and Old Delhi Railway Stations are at distances of around 12 km, 7 km, 15 km and 14 km respectively.

History 
From the historical cultural, theological and archeological point of view the area is a prosperous one. This has been proved from the research work and excavations done in Trans-Hindon. The excavation carried out at the mound of Kaseri situated on the bank of the Hindon River, 2 km north of Mohan Nagar shows that civilization was developed here in 2500 BC.[1] 
During the reign of Sultan Muhammad bin Tughluq in 1313, this entire region had become a huge battlefield.[2] Sultan Nasiruddin who was famous for his simplicity and honesty spent his childhood in the Loni fort nearby. The attack of Taimur came on the Loni fort and the human massacre by him are well known references of history. The importance of Loni increased during the Mughal period as the Mughal emperors used to come here for hunting and pleasure trips. A Baage Ranap is a memorial of that period.

This area also witnessed fierce battles during the Revolt of 1857, as the revolting Sepoys marched into Delhi through this place and the company forces tried to stop them. Being very close to Shahdara, which has been a very important centre for trade and commerce to the east of Yamuna, for the last 400 years, it can be presumed that Shalimar Garden and nearby areas have ever since been very prosperous.

The modern locality of Shalimar Garden, although is very new relatively and started developing only in the late 1960s, when small labour settlements started springing up thanks to the new industrial set-ups in the Sahibabad Industrial area. By the early 70's, local real estate developers, keeping in mind the locational advantage of the area, started developing the area by deforesting the remaining jungles and acquiring the farmlands from the villagers of Pasonda and Bhopura. Streets were laid, and other civic amenities like sanitation, drainage, electricity etc. were taken care of and numerous plots of varying sizes were sold off. Until, the late nineties, almost all the plots had landed in the hands of small and big builder-promoters, who promptly constructed an apartment building on every plot, thus over-burdening the infrastructure greatly. This, until the close of the last decade, caused a lot of infrastructural problems right from frequent load shedding to water-scarcity, etc. but those were teething problems every new establishment faces, and now they are beginning to get sorted out as is also the case in other neighbouring localities.

All this while, the population of the area, swelled enormously and acquired a pleasant cosmopolitan feel. Most of the new settlers were from far-off places of North, South and East India. They were generally white  or blue collar professionals working at the Industries nearby and many also in Central Delhi Offices. Most chose the locality because of its locational advantage, easy access from the central business district of Delhi, and affordability. Also, a large community of displaced Pandits from the Kashmir Valley settled up here under their rehabilitation plan, starting from the early nineties. Thus, it came to be a middle-class haven and is today a bustling locality with a vibrant cultural life.

Popular Place
Dr Ram Manohar Lohia Park 
Chandra Shekhar Park
Rishab Park
Mahavir park
Ekta park
Gaur Plaza
Cake Town
PLOT NO - 188 EXTENSION 1

References 

Neighbourhoods in Ghaziabad, Uttar Pradesh